Perișor is a commune in Dolj County, Oltenia, Romania with a population of 1,890 people. It is composed of two villages, Mărăcinele and Perișor.

References

Communes in Dolj County
Localities in Oltenia